All Asia Multimedia Network FZ-LLC is a foreign company in Malaysia. It is a content aggregation arm of the pan-regional pay-TV group Astro All Asia Networks plc.

External links 
 Astro All Asia Networks

Privately held companies of Malaysia